Events from the 11th century in Canada.

Events
 985–1014: Viking explorations. Norsemen, including Erik the Red and Leif Ericson, set up outposts in North America and encounter Inuit, Beothuks and Micmacs.
 c. 1000: Thule people arrive in Nunavut.
 c. 1000: Leif (the Lucky) Ericson reaches L'Anse aux Meadows, in Newfoundland.
 c. 1000: The land that would become Canada supports 300,000 native people.
 c. 1007: Gudrid (born in Iceland around 950) gives birth to a son, Snorri Thorfinnsson, the first European child born in North America.
 c. 1014: The first European colony in North America is established at L'Anse aux Meadows, Newfoundland.

See also

List of North American settlements by year of foundation
History of Canada
Timeline of Canada history
List of years in Canada
Timeline of the European colonization of North America
Norse colonization of North America

References

Further reading 
 

 
Centuries in Canada